Narukullapadu is a village in Palnadu district of the Indian state of Andhra Pradesh. It is located in Amaravathi mandal of Guntur revenue division. Kondaveeti Vagu river flows through the village, which frequently floods causing significant damage to crops and risking lives. The village forms a part of Andhra Pradesh Capital Region, under the jurisdiction of APCRDA.

Geography 

Demographics 

 Census of India, Narukullapadu had a population of 2,335. The total population constitutes 1127 males and 1208 females —a sex ratio of 1023 females per 1000 males. 238 children are in the age group of 0–6 years, with child sex ratio of 1003 girls per 1000 boys. The average literacy rate stands at 59.50% with 1,287 literates.

Government and politics 

Narukullapadu Gram Panchayat is the local self-government of the village. There are wards, each represented by an elected ward member. The present sarpanch is vacant, elected by the ward members. The village is administered by the  Amaravathi Mandal Parishad at the intermediate level of panchayat raj institutions.

Education 

As per the school information report for the academic year 2018–19, the village has a total of 2 MPP schools.

References 

Villages in Palnadu district